Fiesta (Spanish for "religious feast", "festival", or "party") may refer to:

Events
Fiesta San Antonio, a 10-day event held every April in San Antonio, Texas
St. Peter's Fiesta, a five-day festival in Gloucester, Massachusetts
Fiestas de Santa Fe, a festival held in Santa Fe, New Mexico

Film and television
Fiesta (1941 film), an American film by LeRoy Prinz
Fiesta (1947 film), an MGM film starring Esther Williams and Ricardo Montalbán
Fiesta (1995 film), a French film by Pierre Boutron
Fiesta (TV series), a 1958 Australian music and dance programme

Music
The Fiestas, an American R&B group

Albums
Fiesta (Carlito album), 2006
Fiesta (Denise Rosenthal album), 2013
Fiesta (Fiskales Ad-Hok album), 1998
Fiesta (Miranda album), 1999
Fiesta (Raffaella Carrà album), 1977
Fiesta! Magsasaya Ang Lahat, by 6cyclemind, 2006
Fiesta, by Juan Carlos Alvarado, 2004

Songs
"Fiesta" (Helena Paparizou song), 2016
"Fiesta" (Iz*One song), 2020
"Fiesta" (The Pogues song), 1988
"Fiesta" (R. Kelly song), 2001
"Fiesta" (Soulhead song), 2005
"Fiesta", by Bomba Estéreo from Amanecer
"Fiesta", by Ween from La Cucaracha

Transport
Apco Fiesta, an Israeli paraglider design
Ford Fiesta, a subcompact car by Ford Motors
MS SeaFrance Cézanne or MS Fiesta, a cross-channel ferry operated by SNCF
MS Stena Fantasia or MS Fiesta, a cross-channel ferry operated by Sealink and Stena Line, now known as the Wawel

Other uses
Fiesta (apple), an apple cultivar
Fiesta (dinnerware), the line of Homer Laughlin China Co. dinnerware
Fiesta (magazine), a British soft-core porn magazine
Fiesta (novel) or The Sun Also Rises, a  1926 novel by Ernest Hemingway
Fiesta Mart, a Texas supermarket chain
Fiesta Online, a 2007 MMORPG video game by OnSon Soft
Fast Imaging Employing Steady-state Acquisition, a GE brand name for its steady-state free precession imaging technology
Pump It Up Fiesta, 2010–2013 versions of the Pump It Up video game series
 A condom brand sold by DKT International

See also 
Fiesta Bowl, an American college football bowl game
La Fiesta (disambiguation)
Festival (disambiguation)